The Northern Lakes Conference of Indiana (NLC) is an IHSAA-sanctioned athletic conference of high schools located within Elkhart, Kosciusko, Marshall and St. Joseph counties in northern Indiana, United States.

History
To deal with the reorganization and consolidation of high schools across Northern Indiana, an organizational meeting for the formation of the Northern Lakes Conference was held on February 3, 1963.  Charter members of the NLC were the high schools of Bremen, Manchester, Nappanee, Plymouth, Rochester and Warsaw.  The conference began competition in 1964–65 in Boys’ Baseball, Football, Basketball and Track.  In 1965, Boys’ Tennis and Golf were added; Cross-Country was added in 1966; and Wrestling became a conference sport in 1968.  The conference was “intended to provide good, clean competition and fellowship for the boys, the coaches, and the school bodies of the Northern Lakes region.”

Concord High School joined the NLC in 1967 and Wawasee High School joined in 1968.  By 1970, all schools participated in all eight boys’ sports.

In the 1970s Girls’ sports were added. Conference competition began in 1976–77 in Basketball, Tennis, Track and Volleyball.  In 1980 Swimming was added; Cross-Country was added in 1986, Softball in 1987; Golf in 1994; and Soccer in 1997.

Additional sports added to NLC Boys’ competition included Swimming in 1980 and Soccer in 1994.

Membership in the Northern Lakes Conference has fluctuated between six and eight schools throughout conference history.  In 1976, Manchester changed conferences.  1987 and 1989, Rochester and Bremen withdrew memberships to begin competition with schools of lesser size and less travel than those of the NLC membership.  Additions to the Northern Lakes Conference were Goshen in 1976 and Northridge in 1987.  Elkhart Memorial began  competition in winter sports in 2000 and all other sports in 2001–02.

The Northern Lakes Conference is recognized as one of the athletic conferences in the state of Indiana.  Competitions at the state level include NLC student athletes in most every sport.  The NLC started offering a formal coaching education course in 1991.  NLC principals and athletic directors are regularly seated in governing bodies for athletic administration at the state level.

On March 7, 2018, the Northern Lakes Conference announced that Elkhart Memorial High School will cease to be a member of the conference at the conclusion of the 2019- 2020 school year. In the fall of 2020, Elkhart Memorial and Elkhart Central high schools will consolidate forming one Elkhart High School.  The new school will retain Elkhart Central's position in the Northern Indiana Conference.

The conference announced it will be accepting applications for membership through May 15, 2018. The NLC announced in July 2018 that Mishawaka High School will join for the 2020-21 school year, leaving the NIC.

Basketball 

The NLC has a rich basketball history, producing NBA stars like Scott Skiles, Rick Fox, and Shawn Kemp. On February 11, 2017, the Warsaw Tigers made league history by becoming the first team to win the conference in three consecutive years while going undefeated (21-0) during that span.

Membership

 Mascot was Redskins until 2016.

Former members

 Played concurrently in NLC and MCC 1963-66. 
 Elkhart Memorial played in both the NIC and NLC from 1999 to 2001.

Conference Championships

Football

Boys Basketball

Girls Basketball

State Championships

Concord (3)

 1964 Boys Gymnastics
 1965 Boys Gymnastics
 1966 Boys Gymnastics

Elkhart Memorial (0)

Goshen (3)

 1978 Football (2A)
 1988 Football (4A)
 2014 Soccer (2A)

Northridge (2)

 1988 Softball
 2004 Boys Cross Country

NorthWood (3)

 1999 Girls Basketball (3A)
 2005 Football (3A)
 2020 Girls Basketball (3A)

Plymouth (4)

 1977 Football (2A)
 1982 Boys Basketball
 2007 Boys Basketball (3A)
 2008 Girls Basketball (3A)

Warsaw (5)

 1976 Girls Basketball
 1978 Girls Basketball
 1984 Boys Basketball
 1991 Softball
 2005 Boys Golf

Wawasee (1)

 1976 Girls Track & Field

References

External links
NLC Website
IHSAA Conferences
IHSAA Directory

Indiana high school athletic conferences
High school sports conferences and leagues in the United States
Education in Elkhart County, Indiana
Education in Kosciusko County, Indiana
Education in Marshall County, Indiana
1963 establishments in Indiana